The Oakbank Hospital was a health facility in Possil Road, Glasgow, Scotland.

History
Oakbank was originally a Poor Law hospital, commissioned by the Glasgow Parish Council.  The facility, which was designed by Alex Cullen, opened as the Western District Hospital in September 1904, on the same day as Stobhill Hospital in Springburn and the Eastern District Hospital at Duke Street. It joined the National Health Service in 1948 and closed in 1965. The buildings were subsequently used as a temporary facility for the Royal Hospital for Sick Children during reconstruction in the late 1960s and have since been demolished.

References

Hospitals in Glasgow
1904 establishments in Scotland
Hospitals established in 1904
Hospital buildings completed in 1904
Defunct hospitals in Scotland
1965 disestablishments in Scotland
Hospitals disestablished in 1965
NHS Scotland hospitals